State Route 193 (SR 193) is a  state highway in the northwestern part of the U.S. state of Georgia. It runs southeast-to-north through portions of Walker county.

Route description
SR 193 begins at an intersection with US 27/SR 1 (Lyle Jones Parkway) in LaFayette. This intersection also contains SR 136 (East Villanow Street). The road heads west into the main part of town, where it has a concurrency with US 27 Business/SR 1 Business. The road continues west out of town and gradually curves to the northwest and intersects SR 341 (Cove Road). It then curves to the northeast and has a second intersection with SR 136 (Lookout Mountain Scenic Highway). In Chattanooga Valley, there is a second intersection with SR 341 (Chickamauga Road). Just northeast of Chattanooga Valley is SR 2 (Battlefield Parkway). SR 193 continues to the northeast until it meets its northern terminus, Tennessee State Route 17, at the Tennessee state line, southeast of Lookout Mountain, Tennessee.

Major intersections

See also

References

External links

 
 Georgia Roads (Routes 181 - 200)
 Georgia State Route 193 on State-Ends.com

193
Transportation in Walker County, Georgia